Stock Township is one of the fifteen townships of Harrison County, Ohio, United States.  The 2000 census found 432 people in the township; and the 2010 census, 478.

Geography
Located in the north central part of the county, it borders the following townships:
North Township - north
Archer Township - east
Cadiz Township - southeast
Nottingham Township - southwest
Franklin Township - west
Monroe Township - northwest

No municipalities are located in Stock Township.

Name and history
Statewide, the only other Stock Township is located in Noble County.

Government
The township is governed by a three-member board of trustees, who are elected in November of odd-numbered years to a four-year term beginning on the following January 1. Two are elected in the year after the presidential election and one is elected in the year before it. There is also an elected township fiscal officer, who serves a four-year term beginning on April 1 of the year after the election, which is held in November of the year before the presidential election. Vacancies in the fiscal officership or on the board of trustees are filled by the remaining trustees.

References

External links
County website

Townships in Harrison County, Ohio
Townships in Ohio